Xfinity Center may refer to any of these places in the United States:

 Xfinity Center (Mansfield, Massachusetts), an amphitheatre in Mansfield, Massachusetts
 Xfinity Center (College Park, Maryland), an arena and activities center at the University of Maryland

See also
 Xfinity Theatre, an amphitheatre in Hartford, Connecticut, US
 Xfinity Live! Philadelphia, a venue in Pennsylvania, US
 Xfinity Arena, former name of Angel of the Winds Arena, a venue in Everett, Washington, US
 Comcast Center (disambiguation)